Spike Rawlings (birth name John Anderson Rawlinson; 7 April 1944 – 14 March 2006) was an English professional footballer who later became a TV entertainer after retiring as a sportsman.

Career

Football career
After playing for amateur side Corinthian Juniors, Rawlinson - who played as a centre half - made his professional debut for Bury during the 1964–65 season, making a total of two League appearances that season. After the football season finished, Rawlinson moved to Barrow. During the 1965–66 season, Rawlinson scored two goals in nineteen League games for Barrow. Rawlinson later played non-league football for Runcorn, and eventually returned to Barrow (although he never appeared in a first team League game for the club again), where he got his first taste of showbiz in 1969 - after the half-time entertainment failed to show up, Rawlinson stepped in and performed instead.

Entertainment career
After finishing his career as a professional footballer, Rawlinson adopted the stage name of Spike Rawlings. His early career was spent warming audiences up on local TV show Those Wonderful TV Times. Rawlings achieved fame by winning the 1976 edition of TV talent show Opportunity Knocks, which allowed him to have his own TV show. Rawlings later had a small part on When the Boat Comes In, and he regularly acted in pantomimes.

Later life
During the late 1980s and 1990s, Rawlings suffered from financial issues. He died in March 2006 in hospital, awaiting a liver transplant. A charity night, organised by his children Matthew and Catherine, was held in October 2006 in Rawlings' memory.

References

External links

1944 births
2006 deaths
English footballers
Bury F.C. players
Barrow A.F.C. players
Runcorn F.C. Halton players
English Football League players
Association football defenders
Reality show winners
English television presenters